Joseph "JoJo" Ward (born December 9, 1997) is an American football wide receiver for the Houston Gamblers of the United States Football League (USFL). He played college football at Hawaii.

High school career 
Ward attended Midway High School, where he was named the District 12-6A offensive MVP as a senior.

College career 
Ward played at Tyler Junior College in Tyler, Texas, where he racked up over 1,000 yards receiving and nine touchdowns in two seasons. He joined the Hawaii roster in July 2018 at the last minute as a walk-on.

Ward was named to the Earl Campbell Award watchlist before the start of the 2019 season, and was named its national player of the week in week 2 of the season, where he caught ten passes for 189 yards and all four of Hawaii's touchdowns against Oregon State. He also was named the Mountain West Offensive Player of the Week for the same performance.

College statistics

Professional career

Arizona Cardinals
After going undrafted in the 2020 NFL draft, Ward signed with the Arizona Cardinals on April 25, 2020. On September 5, 2020, Ward was waived during final roster cuts. He was re-signed to the practice squad a day later. He signed a reserve/future contract on January 5, 2021. He was waived on August 16, 2021.

Cleveland Browns
On August 19, 2021, Ward signed with the Cleveland Browns. Ward was waived by the Browns on August 20, 2021.

Houston Gamblers
Ward was drafted by the Houston Gamblers of the United States Football League in the 14th round of the 2022 USFL Draft. He was transferred to the team's inactive roster on April 22, 2022. He was moved back to the active roster on May 20.

References

External links 
 Arizona Cardinals bio
 Hawaii Rainbow Warriors bio

1997 births
Living people
Sportspeople from Waco, Texas
American football wide receivers
Tyler Apaches football players
Hawaii Rainbow Warriors football players
Arizona Cardinals players
Players of American football from Texas
African-American players of American football
21st-century African-American sportspeople
Cleveland Browns players
Houston Gamblers (2022) players